Events from the year 1962 in Denmark.

Incumbents
 Monarch – Frederick IX
 Prime minister – Viggo Kampmann (until 3 February), Jens Otto Krag

Events
 10 November  The Langeland Bridge is unaugurated.

Undated

Sports

Badminton
 2124 March  All England Badminton Championships
 Erland Kops wins gold in Men's Single
 Finn Kobberø and Jørgen Hammergaard Hansen win gold in Men's Double
 Finn Kobberø and Ulla Strand win gold medal in Mixed Double.

Handball
 15 July – Denmark wins silver at the 1962 World Women's Handball Championship, arranged in Romania, after being defeated by Romania in the final.

Births
21 February - Lars Ramkilde Knudsen, researcher
30 May - Pia Juul, poet, prose writer, and translator (died 2020)
7 July - Klaus Tange, actor
6 August - Søren Hyldgaard, film composer (died 2018)
15 August - Jesper W. Nielsen, film director and editor
16 August - Solvej Balle, writer
1 November - Hella Joof, actress, comedian, and director
30 November - Søren Steen Jespersen, director, producer and writer

Deaths
 16 June – Hans Kirk, author (born 1898)
 19 August – Emilius Bangert, composer and organist (born 1883)
 7 September – Karen Blixen, author, farmer painter (born 1885)
 19 September – Karl Albert Hasselbalch, physician and chemist, pioneer in the use of pH measurement in medicine (born 1874)
 29 November – Erik Scavenius, politician, Prime Minister of Denmark (born 1877)

See also
1962 in Danish television

References

 
Denmark
Years of the 20th century in Denmark
1960s in Denmark